Gradac is a village in the municipality of Tutin, Serbia. According to the 2002 census, the village has a population of 95 people.

History
The Shkreli tribe migrated to the Pešter region in the 18th century. The majority of them were subsequently Slavicised, however in some villages such as and Gradac, they managed to maintain the original Albanian language until this day.

References

Populated places in Raška District